Rush Lake may refer to:

Places
Canada
 Rush Lake, Saskatchewan

United States
 Rush Lake, Wisconsin
 Rush Lake Township, Minnesota
 Rush Lake Township, North Dakota

Lakes
Pakistan
 Rush Lake (Pakistan), near Rush Peak in Gilgit-Baltistan, Pakistan

United States
 Rush Lake (Michigan), part of Rush Lake State Game Area in Michigan
 Rush Lake (Minnesota), a lake in Otter Tail County, Minnesota
 Rush Lake, in Minneota Township, Minnesota of Jackson County
 Rush Lake, in Sioux Valley Township, Minnesota of Jackson County
 Rush Lake (South Dakota)
 Rush Lake (Iron County, Utah)
 Rush Lake (Tooele County, Utah), a remnant of Lake Bonneville
 Rush Lake (Wisconsin), a lake in Winnebago County, Wisconsin